Yang Shuo (born 2 January 1983) is a Chinese actor. He is known for his role as Bao Yifan in the drama Ode to Joy.

Filmography

Film

Television series

Awards and nominations

References

External links
 

1983 births
21st-century Chinese male actors
Living people
Chinese male television actors
Male actors from Heilongjiang
Hui male actors
Central Academy of Drama alumni